Mull and Iona Community Hospital is a community hospital in Java Road, Craignure, Scotland. It is managed by NHS Highland.

History
The facility was commissioned to replace the aging Dunaros Residential Care Centre and the Salen Community Hospital. It was designed by CMA Architects and built by a local contractor at a cost of £8 million; it was opened in 2012. Additional roads were provided later to improve access to this remote facility.

References

NHS Scotland hospitals
2012 establishments in Scotland
Hospitals established in 2012
Hospitals in Argyll and Bute
Hospital buildings completed in 2012